The 1998–99 Copa del Rey was the 97th staging of the Copa del Rey.

The competition started on 1 September 1998 and concluded on 26 May 1999 with the Final, held at the Estadio La Cartuja in Sevilla.

First round 

|}

Second round 
Second Round [Sep 24; Oct 7]

|}

Third round 

|}

Fourth round 
Fourth Round [Dec 16; Jan 13]

|}

Round of 16 

|}

Quarter-finals 

|}

Semi-finals 

|}

Final

Top goalscorers

External links 
 www.linguasport.com 

Copa del Rey seasons
1998–99 in Spanish football cups